

Events

Pre-1600
 951 – Emperor Li Jing sends a Southern Tang expeditionary force of 10,000 men under Bian Hao to conquer Chu. Li Jing removes the ruling family to his own capital in Nanjing, ending the Chu Kingdom.
1272 – While travelling during the Ninth Crusade, Prince Edward becomes King of England upon Henry III of England's death, but he will not return to England for nearly two years to assume the throne.
1491 – An auto-da-fé, held in the Brasero de la Dehesa outside of Ávila, concludes the case of the Holy Child of La Guardia with the public execution of several Jewish and converso suspects.
1532 – Francisco Pizarro and his men capture Inca Emperor Atahualpa at the Battle of Cajamarca.

1601–1900
1632 – King Gustavus Adolphus of Sweden was killed at the Battle of Lützen during the Thirty Years' War.
1776 – American Revolutionary War: British and Hessian units capture Fort Washington from the Patriots.
1793 – French Revolution: Ninety dissident Roman Catholic priests are executed by drowning at Nantes.
1797 – The Prussian heir apparent, Frederick William, becomes King of Prussia as Frederick William III.
1805 – Napoleonic Wars: Battle of Schöngrabern: Russian forces under Pyotr Bagration delay the pursuit by French troops under Joachim Murat.
1822 – American Old West: Missouri trader William Becknell arrives in Santa Fe, New Mexico, over a route that became known as the Santa Fe Trail.
1828 – Greek War of Independence: The London Protocol entails the creation of an autonomous Greek state under Ottoman suzerainty, encompassing the Morea and the Cyclades.
1849 – A Russian court sentences writer Fyodor Dostoyevsky to death for anti-government activities linked to a radical intellectual group; his sentence is later commuted to hard labor.
1855 – David Livingstone becomes the first European to see the Victoria Falls in what is now Zambia-Zimbabwe.
1857 – Second relief of Lucknow: Twenty-four Victoria Crosses are awarded, the most in a single day.
1863 – American Civil War: In the Battle of Campbell's Station, Confederate troops unsuccessfully attack Union forces which allows General Ambrose Burnside to secure Knoxville, Tennessee.
1871 – The National Rifle Association of America receives its charter from New York State.
1885 – Canadian rebel leader of the Métis and "Father of Manitoba" Louis Riel is executed for treason.

1901–present
1904 – English engineer John Ambrose Fleming receives a patent for the thermionic valve (vacuum tube).
1907 – Indian Territory and Oklahoma Territory join to form Oklahoma, which is admitted as the 46th U.S. state.
1914 – The Federal Reserve Bank of the United States officially opens.
1920 – Qantas, Australia's national airline, is founded as Queensland and Northern Territory Aerial Services Limited.
1933 – The United States and the Soviet Union establish formal diplomatic relations.
1938 – LSD is first synthesized by Albert Hofmann from ergotamine at the Sandoz Laboratories in Basel.
1940 – World War II: In response to the leveling of Coventry by the German Luftwaffe two days before, the Royal Air Force bombs Hamburg.
  1940   – The Holocaust: In occupied Poland, the Nazis close off the Warsaw Ghetto from the outside world.
  1940   – New York City's "Mad Bomber" George Metesky places his first bomb at a Manhattan office building used by Consolidated Edison.
1944 – World War II: In support of the Battle of Hürtgen Forest, the town of Düren is destroyed by Allied aircraft.
1945 – UNESCO is founded.
1965 – Venera program: The Soviet Union launches the Venera 3 space probe toward Venus, which will be the first spacecraft to reach the surface of another planet.
1973 – Skylab program: NASA launches Skylab 4 with a crew of three astronauts from Cape Canaveral, Florida for an 84-day mission.
  1973   – U.S. President Richard Nixon signs the Trans-Alaska Pipeline Authorization Act into law, authorizing the construction of the Alaska Pipeline.
1974 – The Arecibo message is broadcast from Puerto Rico.
1979 – The first line of Bucharest Metro (Line M1) is opened from Timpuri Noi to Semănătoarea in Bucharest, Romania.
1988 – The Supreme Soviet of the Estonian Soviet Socialist Republic declares that Estonia is "sovereign" but stops short of declaring independence.
  1988   – In the first open election in more than a decade, voters in Pakistan elect populist candidate Benazir Bhutto to be Prime Minister of Pakistan.
1989 – El Salvadoran army troops kill six Jesuit priests and two others at Jose Simeon Canas University.
1990 – Pop group Milli Vanilli are stripped of their Grammy Award because the duo did not sing at all on the Girl You Know It's True album. Session musicians had provided all the vocals.
1992 – The Hoxne Hoard is discovered by metal detectorist Eric Lawes in Hoxne, Suffolk.
1997 – After nearly 18 years of incarceration, China releases Wei Jingsheng, a pro-democracy dissident, from jail for medical reasons.
2002 – The first cases of the 2002–2004 SARS outbreak are traced to Foshan, Guangdong Province, China.
2005 – Following a 31-year wait, Australia defeats Uruguay in a penalty shootout to qualify for the 2006 FIFA World Cup.
2022 – Artemis Program: NASA launches Artemis 1 on the first flight of the Space Launch System, the start of the program's future missions to the moon.

Births

Pre-1600
42 BC – Tiberius, Roman emperor (d. 37 AD)
1436 – Leonardo Loredan, Italian ruler (d. 1521)
1457 – Beatrice of Naples, Hungarian queen (d. 1508)
1466 – Francesco Cattani da Diacceto, Florentine philosopher (d. 1522)
1483 – Elisabeth of the Palatinate, Landgravine of Hesse, German noble (d. 1522) 
1528 – Jeanne d'Albret, Queen of Navarre (d. 1572)
1531 – Anna d'Este, Duchess consort of Nemours (d. 1607)
1538 – Saint Turibius of Mongrovejo, Spanish Grand Inquisitioner, Archbishop of Lima (d. 1606)
1540 – Princess Cecilia of Sweden (d. 1627)
1566 – Anna Juliana Gonzaga, Archduchess of Austria and nun (d. 1621)
1569 – Paul Sartorius, German organist and composer (d. 1609)

1601–1900
1603 – Augustyn Kordecki, Polish monk (d. 1673)
1643 – Jean Chardin, French-English jeweler and explorer (d. 1703)
1648 – Charles Duncombe, English banker and politician (d. 1711)
1715 – Girolamo Abos, Maltese-Italian composer and educator (d. 1760)
1717 – Jean le Rond d'Alembert, French mathematician, physicist, and philosopher (d. 1793)
1720 – Carlo Antonio Campioni, French-Italian composer (d. 1788)
1750 – Edward Law, 1st Baron Ellenborough, English lawyer, judge, and politician (d. 1818)
1753 – James McHenry, Irish-American surgeon and politician (d. 1816)
1758 – Peter Andreas Heiberg, Danish philologist and author (d. 1841)
1774 – Georg von Cancrin, German-Russian Minister of Finance (d. 1845)
1793 – Francis Danby, Irish painter of the Romantic era (d. 1861)
1806 – Mary Tyler Peabody Mann, American author and educator (d. 1887)
1807 – Jónas Hallgrímsson, Icelandic poet, author and naturalist (d. 1845)
1811 – John Bright, English academic and politician (d. 1889)
1836 – Kalākaua of Hawaii (d. 1891)
1839 – Louis-Honoré Fréchette, Canadian poet, author, and politician (d. 1908)
1841 – Jules Violle, French physicist and academic (d. 1923)
1847 – Edmund James Flynn, Canadian lawyer and politician (d. 1927)
1851 – Minnie Hauk, American-Swiss soprano and actress (d. 1929)
1856 – Jürgen Kröger, German architect (d. 1928)
1861 – Luigi Facta, Italian politician and journalist (d. 1930)
  1861   – Georgina Febres-Cordero, Venezuelan nun (d. 1925)
1862 – Charles Turner, Australian cricketer (d. 1944)
1873 – W. C. Handy, American trumpet player and composer (d. 1958)
1874 – Alexander Kolchak, Russian admiral and explorer (d. 1920)
1883 – Emil Breitkreutz, American runner and coach (d. 1972)
1888 – Luis Cluzeau Mortet, Uruguayan pianist and composer (d. 1957)
1889 – George S. Kaufman, American director, producer, and playwright (d. 1961)
  1889   – Dietrich Kraiß, German general (d. 1944)
1890 – Elpidio Quirino, 6th President of the Philippines (d. 1956)
1892 – Guo Moruo, Chinese historian, author, and poet (d. 1978)
  1892   – Tazio Nuvolari, Italian race car driver and motorcycle racer (d. 1953)
1894 – Bobby Cruickshank, American golfer (d. 1975)
  1894   – Richard von Coudenhove-Kalergi, Austrian philosopher and politician (d. 1972)
1895 – Paul Hindemith, German composer, violist and conductor (d. 1963)
1896 – Joan Lindsay, Australian author and critic (d. 1984)
  1896   – Oswald Mosley, English fascist leader and politician (d. 1980)
  1896   – Lawrence Tibbett, American actor and singer (d. 1960)
1897 – Choudhry Rahmat Ali, Indian-Pakistani academic (d. 1951)
1899 – Mary Margaret McBride, American radio host (d. 1976)
1900 – Eliška Junková, Czechoslovakian race car driver (d. 1994)

1901–present
1904 – Nnamdi Azikiwe, 1st President of Nigeria (d. 1996)
1905 – Eddie Condon, American guitarist and banjo player (d. 1973)
1907 – Burgess Meredith, American actor, singer, director, producer, and screenwriter (d. 1997)
1909 – Mirza Nasir Ahmad, Indian-Pakistani religious leader (d. 1982)
1912 – George O. Petrie, American actor and director (d. 1997)
  1912   – W. E. D. Ross, Canadian actor, playwright, and author (d. 1995)
1913 – Ellen Albertini Dow, American actress (d. 2015)
1914 – Eddie Chapman, English spy (d. 1997)
1915 – Jean Fritz, Chinese-American author (d. 2017)
1916 – Harold Baigent, New Zealand actor and director (d. 1996)
  1916   – Daws Butler, American voice actor and singer (d. 1988)
  1916   – Al Lucas, Canadian-American bassist (d. 1983)
1922 – Gene Amdahl, American computer scientist, physicist, and engineer (d. 2015)
  1922   – José Saramago, Portuguese novelist and Nobel laureate in Literature (d. 2010)
1924 – Sam Farber, American businessman (d. 2013)
  1924   – Mel Patton, American sprinter and coach (d. 2014)
1927 – Dolo Coker, American pianist and composer (d. 1983)
1928 – Clu Gulager, American actor and director (d. 2022)
1929 – Peter Boizot, English businessman (d. 2018)
1930 – Chinua Achebe, Nigerian novelist, poet, and critic (d. 2013)
  1930   – Paul Foytack, American baseball player
  1930   – Salvatore Riina, Italian mob boss (d. 2017)
1931 – Luciano Bottaro, Italian author and illustrator (d. 2006)
  1931   – Hubert Sumlin, American singer and guitarist (d. 2011)
1933 – Garnet Mimms, American R&B singer
1935 – Elizabeth Drew, American journalist and author
  1935   – Mohammad Hussein Fadlallah, Iraqi-Lebanese cleric, educator, and author (d. 2010)
  1935   – Magdi Yacoub, Egyptian-English surgeon and academic
1936 – John Moore, Australian businessman and politician
1937 – Alan Budd, English economist and academic
1938 – Ahmed Bouanani, Moroccan filmmaker (d. 2011)
  1938   – Kang Ning-hsiang, Taiwanese politician
  1938   – Walter Learning, Canadian actor (d. 2020)
  1938   – Robert Nozick, American philosopher, author, and academic (d. 2002)
  1938   – Troy Seals, American singer-songwriter and guitarist
1939 – Michael Billington, English author and critic
1940 – Donna McKechnie, American actress, singer, and dancer
1941 – Angelo Gilardino, Italian guitarist, composer, and musicologist
  1941   – Gerry Marshall, English race car driver (d. 2005)
  1941   – Dan Penn, American singer-songwriter and producer
1942 – Willie Carson, Scottish jockey and sportscaster
  1942   – Joanna Pettet, English-Canadian actress
1944 – Oliver Braddick, English psychologist and academic (d. 2022)
1945 – Teenie Hodges, American guitarist and songwriter (d. 2014)
  1945   – Lynn Hunt, American historian, author, and academic
1946 – Colin Burgess, Australian drummer and songwriter
  1946   – Barbara Smith, American writer
  1946   – Beverly Smith, American writer
  1946   – Terence McKenna, American botanist, philosopher, and author (d. 2000)
  1946   – Jo Jo White, American basketball player and coach (d. 2018)
1947 – Omar Ruiz Hernández, Cuban journalist and activist
1948 – Tihomir "Pop" Asanović, Croatian jazz-rock keyboardist and composer
  1948   – Horst Bertram, German footballer and manager
  1948   – Chi Coltrane, American singer-songwriter and pianist
  1948   – Bonnie Greer, American-English playwright and critic
  1948   – Ken James, Australian actor
1950 – Manuel Zamora, Filipino farmer and politician
1951 – Andy Dalton, New Zealand rugby player
1952 – Shigeru Miyamoto, Japanese video game designer
1953 – Griff Rhys Jones, Welsh comedian, actor, and author
1954 – Andrea Barrett, American novelist and short story writer
  1954   – Dick Gross, Australian lawyer and politician
1955 – Pierre Larouche, Canadian ice hockey player and coach
  1955   – Guillermo Lasso, President-elect of Ecuador
  1955   – Héctor Cúper, Argentinian footballer, coach, and manager
  1955   – Jun Kunimura, Japanese actor
  1955   – Esteban Trapiello, Venezuelan businessman
1956 – Terry Labonte, American race car driver and businessman
1957 – Jacques Gamblin, French actor
1958 – Marg Helgenberger, American actress
  1958   – Boris Krivokapić, Serbian author and academic
1959 – Glenda Bailey, English journalist
  1959   – Francis M. Fesmire, American cardiologist and physician (d. 2014)
1961 – Frank Bruno, English boxer
1962 – Darwyn Cooke, Canadian writer and artist (d. 2016)
  1962   – Mani, English bass player
1963 – Steve Argüelles, English drummer and producer
  1963   – William Bonner, Brazilian newscaster, publicist and journalist
  1963   – Zina Garrison, American tennis player
1964 – Waheed Alli, Baron Alli, English businessman and politician
  1964   – Valeria Bruni Tedeschi, Italian-French actress, director, and screenwriter
  1964   – Dwight Gooden, American baseball player
  1964   – Diana Krall, Canadian singer-songwriter and pianist
  1964   – Maeve Quinlan, American actress
1965 – Mika Aaltonen, Finnish footballer
1966 – Joey Cape, American singer-songwriter, guitarist, and producer
  1966   – Stephen Critchlow, English actor (d. 2021)
  1966   – Dave Kushner, American guitarist 
  1966   – Christian Lorenz, German keyboard player 
  1966   – Dean McDermott, Canadian-American actor and producer
  1966   – Tahir Shah, English journalist, author, and explorer
1967 – Craig Arnold, American poet and academic (d. 2009)
  1967   – Lisa Bonet, American actress and director
1968 – Shobha Nagi Reddy, Indian politician (d. 2014)
  1968   – Melvin Stewart, American swimmer
1970 – Logan Mader, Canadian-American guitarist and producer 
  1970   – Martha Plimpton, American actress 
1971 – Tanja Damaske, German javelin thrower and shot putter
  1971   – Mustapha Hadji, Moroccan footballer and manager
  1971   – Annely Peebo, Estonian soprano and actress
  1971   – Alexander Popov, Russian swimmer and coach
  1971   – Waqar Younis, Pakistani cricketer and coach
1972 – Missi Pyle, American actress and singer 
1973 – Christian Horner, English race car driver and manager
  1973   – Brendan Laney, New Zealand-Scottish rugby player and sportscaster
1974 – Maurizio Margaglio, Italian ice dancer and coach
  1974   – Paul Scholes, English footballer and sportscaster
1975 – Julio Lugo, Dominican baseball player (d. 2021)
  1975   – Yuki Uchida, Japanese actress, model, and singer
1976 – Dan Black, English singer-songwriter 
  1976   – Juha Pasoja, Finnish footballer
  1976   – Martijn Zuijdweg, Dutch swimmer
1977 – Oksana Baiul, Ukrainian-American figure skater
  1977   – Gigi Edgley, Australian singer-songwriter and actress
  1977   – Maggie Gyllenhaal, American actress and singer
  1977   – Mauricio Ochmann, Mexican actor and producer
1978 – Kip Bouknight, American baseball player
  1978   – Mehtap Doğan-Sızmaz, Turkish runner
  1978   – Takashi Nagayama, Japanese actor
  1978   – Gary Naysmith, Scottish footballer and manager
  1978   – Carolina Parra, Brazilian guitarist and drummer 
1979 – Bruce Irons, American surfer
1980 – Moris Carrozzieri, Italian footballer
  1980   – Kayte Christensen, American basketball player
  1980   – Nicole Gius, Italian skier
  1980   – Carol Huynh, Canadian wrestler
  1980   – Hasan Üçüncü, Turkish footballer
1981 – Fernando Cabrera, Puerto Rican baseball player
  1981   – Allison Crowe, Canadian singer-songwriter 
  1981   – Caitlin Glass, American voice actress, singer, and director
  1981   – Kate Miller-Heidke, Australian singer-songwriter
  1981   – Osi Umenyiora, English-American football player
1982 – Nonito Donaire, Filipino-American boxer
  1982   – Jannie du Plessis, South African rugby player
  1982   – Ronald Pognon, French sprinter
  1982   – Amar'e Stoudemire, American-Israeli basketball player
1983 – Chris Gocong, American football player
  1983   – Kool A.D., American rapper 
  1983   – Kari Lehtonen, Finnish ice hockey player
  1983   – Britta Steffen, German swimmer
  1983   – Janette Manrara, American professional dancer and choreographer
1984 – Gemma Atkinson, English model and actress
  1984   – Mark Bunn, English footballer
  1984   – Tamawashi Ichiro, Mongolian sumo wrestler
1985 – Aditya Roy Kapur, Indian film actor
  1985   – Sanna Marin, Finnish politician, the Prime Minister of Finland
1986 – Omar Mateen, Islamic terrorist, perpetrator of the Orlando nightclub shooting (d. 2016)
  1986   – Maxime Médard, French rugby player
1987 – Eitan Tibi, Israeli footballer
  1987   – Jordan Walden, American baseball player
1989 – Iamsu!, American rapper and producer 
1990 – Arjo Atayde, Filipino actor
  1990   – Dénes Dibusz, Hungarian football player
1991 – Tomomi Kasai, Japanese actress and singer 
1992 – George Akpabio, Nigerian footballer
  1992   – Matthew Allwood, Australian rugby league player
1993 – Pete Davidson, American comedian and actor
1994 – Brandon Larracuente, American actor
  1994   – Yoshiki Yamamoto, Japanese football player
1995 – Noah Gray-Cabey, American actor and pianist

Deaths

Pre-1600
 897 – Gu Yanhui, Chinese warlord
 987 – Shen Lun, Chinese scholar-official
1005 – Ælfric of Abingdon, Archbishop of Canterbury
1093 – Saint Margaret of Scotland (b. 1045)
1131 – Dobrodeia of Kiev, Rus princess and author of medical books
1240 – Edmund Rich, English archbishop and saint (b. 1175)
  1240   – Ibn Arabi, Andalusian Arab philosopher (b. 1165)
1264 – Emperor Lizong of Song China (b. 1205)
1272 – Henry III of England (b. 1207)
1322 – Nasr, Sultan of Granada (b. 1287)
1328 – Prince Hisaaki, Japanese shōgun (b. 1276)
1464 – John, Margrave of Brandenburg-Kulmbach (b. 1406)
1494 – Theda Ukena, German noble (b. 1432)
1580 – Marie of Baden-Sponheim, German Noblewoman (b. 1507)

1601–1900
1601 – Charles Neville, 6th Earl of Westmorland (b. 1542)
1603 – Pierre Charron, French Catholic theologian and philosopher (b. 1541)
1613 – Trajano Boccalini, Italian author and educator (b. 1556)
1625 – Sofonisba Anguissola, Italian painter (b. c. 1532)
1628 – Paolo Quagliati, Italian organist and composer (b. 1555)
1688 – Bengt Gottfried Forselius, Swedish-Estonian scholar and author (b. 1660)
1695 – Pierre Nicole, French philosopher and author (b. 1625)
1724 – Jack Sheppard, English criminal (b. 1702)
1745 – James Butler, 2nd Duke of Ormonde, Irish general and politician, Lord Lieutenant of Ireland (b. 1665)
1773 – John Hawkesworth, English journalist and author (b. 1715)
1779 – Pehr Kalm, Finnish botanist and explorer (b. 1716)
1790 – Daniel of St. Thomas Jenifer, American politician (b. 1723)
1797 – Frederick William II of Prussia (b. 1744)
1802 – André Michaux, French botanist and explorer (b. 1746)
1806 – Moses Cleaveland, American general, lawyer, and politician, founded Cleveland, Ohio (b. 1754)
1808 – Mustafa IV, Ottoman sultan (b. 1779)
1836 – Christiaan Hendrik Persoon, South African-French mycologist and academic (b. 1761)
1878 – Princess Marie of Hesse and by Rhine (b. 1874)
1884 – František Chvostek, Czech-Austrian soldier and physician (b. 1835)
1885 – Louis Riel, Canadian lawyer and politician (b. 1844)

1901–present
1903 – Princess Elisabeth of Hesse and by Rhine (b. 1895)
1907 – Robert I, Duke of Parma (b. 1848)
1908 – Henri-Gustave Joly de Lotbinière, French-Canadian lawyer and politician, 4th Premier of Quebec (b. 1829)
1911 – A. A. Ames, American physician and politician, 9th Mayor of Minneapolis (b. 1842)
  1911   – Lawrence Feuerbach, American shot putter (b. 1879)
1913 – George Barham, English businessman, founded Express County Milk Supply Company (b. 1836)
1922 – Max Abraham, Polish-German physicist and academic (b. 1875)
1939 – Pierce Butler, American lawyer and jurist (b. 1866)
1941 – Eduard Eelma, Estonian footballer (b. 1902)
  1941   – Miina Härma, Estonian organist, composer, and conductor (b. 1864)
1947 – Giuseppe Volpi, Italian businessman and politician, founded the Venice Film Festival (b. 1877) 
1950 – Bob Smith, American physician and surgeon, co-founded Alcoholics Anonymous (b. 1879)
1956 – Ōtori Tanigorō, Japanese sumo wrestler, the 24th Yokozuna (b. 1887)
1960 – Clark Gable, American actor (b. 1901)
1961 – Sam Rayburn, American lawyer and politician, 48th Speaker of the United States House of Representatives (b. 1882)
1964 – Donald C. Peattie, American botanist and author (b. 1898)
1971 – Edie Sedgwick, American model and actress (b. 1943)
1972 – Vera Karalli, Russian ballerina and actress (b. 1889)
1973 – Alan Watts, English-American philosopher, author, and educator (b. 1915)
1974 – Walther Meissner, German physicist and engineer (b. 1882)
1976 – Jack Foster, English cricketer (b. 1905)
1982 – Pavel Alexandrov, Russian mathematician and academic (b. 1896)
1984 – Vic Dickenson, American trombonist (b. 1906)
1986 – Siobhán McKenna, Irish actress (b. 1923)
  1986   – Panditrao Agashe, Indian businessman (b. 1936)
1987 – Jim Brewer, American baseball player and coach (b. 1937)
1989 – Jean-Claude Malépart, Canadian lawyer and politician (b. 1938)
1990 – Ege Bagatur, Turkish politician (b. 1937)
1993 – Lucia Popp, Slovak-German soprano (b. 1939)
  1993   – Achille Zavatta, Tunisia-born French clown (b. 1915)
1994 – Chet Powers, American singer-songwriter and guitarist (b. 1943)
1999 – Daniel Nathans, American microbiologist and academic, Nobel Prize laureate (b. 1928)
2000 – Robert Earl Davis, American hip-hop artist (b. 1971)
  2000   – Ahmet Kaya, Turkish-French singer-songwriter (b. 1957)
2001 – Tommy Flanagan, American pianist and composer (b. 1930)
2005 – Ralph Edwards, American radio and television host and producer (b. 1913)
  2005   – Henry Taube, Canadian-American chemist and academic, Nobel Prize laureate (b. 1915)
  2005   – Donald Watson, English activist, founded the Vegan Society (b. 1910)
2006 – Milton Friedman, American economist and academic, Nobel Prize laureate (b. 1912)
  2006   – Yuri Levada, Russian sociologist and political scientist (b. 1930)
2007 – Harold Alfond, American businessman (b. 1914)
  2007   – Grethe Kausland, Norwegian actress and singer (b. 1947)
  2007   – Trond Kirkvaag, Norwegian actor and screenwriter (b. 1946)
  2007   – Vernon Scannell, English boxer, poet, and author (b. 1922)
2008 – Jan Krugier; Polish-Swiss art dealer (b. 1928)
  2008   – Reg Varney, English actor and screenwriter (b. 1916)
2009 – Antonio de Nigris, Mexican footballer (b. 1978)
  2009   – Sergei Magnitsky, Ukrainian-Russian accountant and lawyer (b. 1972)
  2009   – Edward Woodward, English actor (b. 1930)
2010 – Britton Chance, American biologist and sailor (b. 1913)
  2010   – Ronni Chasen, American publicist (b. 1946)
  2010   – Wyngard Tracy, Filipino DJ and talent manager (b. 1952)
2012 – John Chapman, Australian evangelist and academic (b. 1930)
  2012   – Subhash Dutta, Bangladeshi actor and director (b. 1930)
  2012   – Patrick Edlinger, French mountaineer (b. 1960)
  2012   – Aliu Mahama, Ghanaian engineer and politician, 3rd Vice President of Ghana (b. 1946)
  2012   – Eliyahu Nawi, Iraqi-Israeli lawyer, judge, and politician (b. 1920)
  2012   – Bob Scott, New Zealand rugby player (b. 1921)
2013 – Robert Conley, American journalist (b. 1928)
  2013   – Billy Hardwick, American bowler (b. 1941)
  2013   – William McDonough Kelly, Canadian lieutenant and politician (b. 1925)
  2013   – Tanvir Ahmad Khan, Indian-Pakistani diplomat, 19th Foreign Secretary of Pakistan (b. 1932)
  2013   – Oscar Lanford, American mathematician and academic (b. 1940)
  2013   – Arne Pedersen, Norwegian footballer and manager (b. 1931)
  2013   – Louis D. Rubin, Jr., American author, critic, and academic (b. 1923)
  2013   – Charles Waterhouse, American painter, sculptor, and illustrator (b. 1924)
2014 – Charles Champlin, American historian, author, and critic (b. 1926)
  2014   – Jovan Ćirilov, Serbian poet and playwright (b. 1931)
  2014   – Ian Craig, Australian cricketer (b. 1935)
  2014   – Juan Joseph, American football player and coach (b. 1987)
  2014   – Jadwiga Piłsudska, Polish soldier, pilot, and architect (b. 1920)
  2014   – Carl Sanders, American soldier, pilot, and politician, 74th Governor of Georgia (b. 1925)
2015 – David Canary, American actor (b. 1938)
  2015   – Michael C. Gross, American graphic designer and producer (b. 1945)
  2015   – Bert Olmstead, Canadian ice hockey player and coach (b. 1926)
  2015   – Alton D. Slay, American general (b. 1924)
2016 – Jay Wright Forrester, American computer engineer (b. 1918)
  2016   – Melvin Laird, American politician and writer (b. 1922)
  2016   – Daniel Prodan, Romanian football player (b. 1972)
2017 – Hiromi Tsuru, Japanese actress (b. 1960)
  2017   – Ann Wedgeworth, American actress (b. 1934)
2018 – William Goldman, American novelist, playwright, and screenwriter (b. 1931)
2019 – John Campbell Brown, Scottish astronomer (b. 1947)
  2019   – Terry O'Neill, British photographer (b. 1938)
2020 – Sheila Nelson, English string teacher (b. 1936)
2021 – Jyrki Kasvi, Finnish journalist and politician (b. 1964)
2022 – Robert Clary, French-American actor and author (b. 1926)

Holidays and observances
Christian feast day:
Africus
Agnes of Assisi
Edmund of Abingdon
Elfric of Abingdon
Eucherius of Lyon
Gertrude the Great (Roman Catholic Church)
Giuseppe Moscati
Gobrain
Hugh of Lincoln
Margaret of Scotland
Matthew the Evangelist (Eastern Christianity)
Othmar
Our Lady of the Gate of Dawn
Roch Gonzalez, Juan de Castillo, and Alonso Rodriguez, SJ 
November 16 (Eastern Orthodox liturgics)
Day of Declaration of Sovereignty (Estonia)
Earliest day on which Day of Repentance and Prayer can fall, while November 22 is the latest; celebrated 11 days before Advent Sunday (Lutheran, Reformed (Calvinist) and United Protestant churches, Saxony, Bavaria), and its related observance:
Volkstrauertag (Germany)
Icelandic Language Day or Dagur íslenskrar tungu (Iceland)
International Day for Tolerance (United Nations)
Statia Day in Sint Eustatius (Caribbean Netherlands)

References

External links

 
 
 

Days of the year
November